is a train station in the city of Kurashiki, Okayama Prefecture, Japan. It is on the Mizushima Main Line, operated by the Mizushima Rinkai Railway. Currently, all services stop at this station.

Lines
Mizushima Rinkai Railway
Mizushima Main Line

Adjacent stations

|-
!colspan=5|Mizushima Rinkai Railway

References

Mizushima Rinkai Railway Mizushima Main Line
Railway stations in Okayama Prefecture
Railway stations in Japan opened in 1992
Kurashiki